Richard Waring (born Richard Waring Stephens; 27 May 1911 – 18 January 1993) was an English-American actor. He is perhaps best remembered for his role in the film Mr. Skeffington (1944).

Biography

Richard Waring was born Richard Stephens in Chalfont St Peter, Buckinghamshire in 1911, the son of Thomas E. Stephens, a painter, whose portrait of U.S. President Dwight D. Eisenhower hangs in the Smithsonian Gallery of Presidents. He later adopted Waring, his mother's (Evelyn M. Stephens) maiden name, as his stage name. Waring was the brother of Peter John Stephens, a playwright and author.

Waring began his career in 1931 with Eva Le Gallienne's Civic Repertory Theater in New York City in minor roles in Romeo and Juliet, Camille, and Cradle Song. In 1940, he played opposite Ethel Barrymore in The Corn Is Green and later with Le Gallienne and was signed to play the role in Hollywood opposite Bette Davis, but entered the army during World War II. Before that, he was filmed in his best-known screen role in Mr. Skeffington (1944) as Fanny Trellis' brother Trippy.

After his war service he appeared on Broadway as the Duke of Buckingham in Henry VIII, John Shand in J.M. Barrie's What Every Woman Knows and as the Captain in George Bernard Shaw's Androcles and the Lion. He also appeared in many performances of the American Shakespeare Festival directed by John Houseman and at the Phoenix Theatre in New York City, playing both bit roles and major parts in many of Shakespeare's plays. He acted with Katharine Hepburn in The Merchant of Venice, Much Ado About Nothing, and one performance in A Midsummer Night's Dream as Oberon before she had to leave the production.

Personal life
Waring married American actress Florida Friebus in 1934. They had one child who died in infancy. The couple divorced in 1952. Waring and his second wife Kathy had no children. He became a naturalized United States citizen in 1937, adopting the legal name, Richard Waring.

Death
Waring died of a heart attack on 18 January 1993 in City Island, Bronx, New York.

Broadway theatre credits
 Dear Jane (1932) 
 L'Aiglon (1934) 
 The Women Have Their Way (1935) 
 Camille (1935) 
 The Corn Is Green (1940) 
 At the Stroke of Eight (1940) 
 The Man Who Killed Lincoln (1940; revived the character of John Wilkes Booth in Edwin Booth in 1958) 
 Alice in Wonderland (1947) 
 A Pound on Demand (1947) 
 Androcles and the Lion (1947) 
 What Every Woman Knows (1947)
 King Henry VIII (1947) 
 Gramercy Ghost (1951) 
 Portrait of a Queen (1968)

Radio credits
 Elizabeth the Queen (1952) 
 Second Husband (in the role of Grant Cummings)
 Brothers in Law (1970) (in the role of Henry Blagrove)

Television credits
 Studio One 
 Wuthering Heights (1948)
 Hallmark Hall of Fame: MacDuff in Macbeth (1954) with Maurice Evans and Judith Anderson
 Kiss Me Again, Stranger (1953)
 Alfred Hitchcock Presents, season 3, episode 31, "Festive Season" (1958)
 Hallmark Hall of Fame: Bertrand in Eagle in a Cage with Trevor Howard as Napoleon (1965)

Hollywood credits

Records
Scenes from Romeo and Juliet with Eva Le Gallienne (Atlantic Records, 1951; two-record set)
Poems of Rupert Brooke (Folkways Records, Smithsonian Collection)

References

External links
 
  
 

1911 births
1993 deaths
American male film actors
American male stage actors
American male television actors
American male voice actors
English male film actors
English male stage actors
English male television actors
English male voice actors
People from Chalfont St Peter
English emigrants to the United States
20th-century American male actors
20th-century English male actors
People from City Island, Bronx